Rod Holcomb is an American television director and producer, best known for directing the pilot and finale of ER.

He has directed episodes of numerous television series, including Quincy, M.E., The Six Million Dollar Man, Battlestar Galactica, Fantasy Island, The A-Team, The District, Lost, Invasion, Shark, China Beach, Wiseguy, The Equalizer, Scarecrow and Mrs. King, The Devlin Connection, The Greatest American Hero, Hill Street Blues, The West Wing, and Numb3rs.

Career
In 1979, Holcomb directed the television film Captain America. In 1994, he directed pilot episode of ER, for which he was nominated for a Primetime Emmy Award and won a Directors Guild of America Award. In 1996, he directed the episode "Last Call" and was nominated for another Primetime Emmy. He returned to the show in 2009 to direct its final episode and received a Primetime Emmy for doing so.

In 1997, Holcomb was announced as the director of a Showtime miniseries titled Dying for Our Country. It aired the next year under the title Thanks of a Grateful Nation.  In 2001, he directed the pilot episode of The Education of Max Bickford, and served as executive producer for the overall show.

In 2004, Holcomb served as chair of the Directors Guild of America's television creative rights committee.

Directing style
On his role as a guest director, Holcomb stated:

Unreleased works
In 1997, Holcomb was announced as the director of an adaptation of Arthur C. Clarke's novel A Fall of Moondust. In 1999, he was hired to direct a WWII drama pilot titled Skylark.

Filmography

Film

Television

Awards and nominations

References

American television directors
American television producers
Living people
Primetime Emmy Award winners
Year of birth missing (living people)